California's 16th State Assembly district is one of 80 California State Assembly districts. It is currently represented by Democrat Rebecca Bauer-Kahan of Orinda.

District profile 
The district is located in the East Bay. The most affluent State Assembly district, it consists of suburbs east of the Berkeley Hills, including Lamorinda, the Tri-Valley, and most of Walnut Creek. During Catharine Baker's time in office, it was the most Democratic seat held by a Republican in the Assembly.

Alameda County – 13.3% of Alameda County population
 Dublin
 Livermore
 Pleasanton

Contra Costa County – 25.3% of Contra Costa County population
 Alamo
 Blackhawk
 Danville
 Diablo
 Lafayette
 Moraga
 Orinda
 Saranap
 San Ramon
 Walnut Creek – 82.5% of Walnut Creek population included

Election results from statewide races

List of Assembly Members 
Due to redistricting, the 16th district has been moved around different parts of the state. The current iteration resulted from the 2011 redistricting by the California Citizens Redistricting Commission.

Election results 1992 - present

2020

2018

2016

2014

2012

2010

2008

2006

2004

2002

2000

1998

1996

1994

1992

See also 
 California State Assembly
 California State Assembly districts
 Districts in California

References

External links 
 District map from the California Citizens Redistricting Commission

16
Government of Alameda County, California
Government of Contra Costa County, California
Danville, California
Dublin, California
Lafayette, California
Livermore, California
Orinda, California
Pleasanton, California
San Ramon, California
Walnut Creek, California
Amador Valley
Government in the San Francisco Bay Area